Erard II of Brienne (died 1191) was count of Brienne from 1161 to 1191, and a French general during the Third Crusade, most notably at the Siege of Acre. He was the son of Gautier II, count of Brienne, and Adèle of Baudemont, daughter of Andrew, lord of Baudemont and Agnes of Braine.  His paternal grandparents were Erard I, Count of Brienne and Alix de Roucy. During this siege he saw his brother André of Brienne die on 4 October 1189, before being killed himself on 8 February 1191.  Erard II's nephew was Erard of Brienne-Ramerupt.

Before 1166 he married Agnès of Montfaucon († after 1186), daughter of Amadeus II of Montfaucon and of Béatrice of Grandson-Joinville.  Their children were:

 Walter III of Brienne (died 1205) count of Brienne and claimant to the throne of Sicily.
 William of Brienne (died 1199) lord of Pacy-sur-Armançon, married Eustachie of Courtenay, daughter of Peter I of Courtenay and Elisabeth of Courtenay.
 John of Brienne (1170–1237), king of Jerusalem (1210–1225), then emperor of Constantinople (1231–1237).
 Andrew
 Ida of Brienne who married Ernoul of Reynel lord of Pierrefitte.

References

1191 deaths
Christians of the Third Crusade
Counts of Brienne
House of Brienne
Year of birth unknown